This is a list of the members of the Australian House of Representatives in the 21st Australian Parliament, which was elected at the 1954 election on 29 May 1954.  The incumbent Liberal Party of Australia led by Prime Minister of Australia Robert Menzies with coalition partner the Country Party led by Arthur Fadden lost a net of five seats, but defeated the Australian Labor Party led by Herbert Evatt.

Notes

References

Members of Australian parliaments by term
20th-century Australian politicians